Petrophile biloba, commonly known as granite petrophile, is a species of flowering plant in the family Proteaceae and is endemic to southwestern Western Australia. It is a shrub with pinnately-divided leaves with sharply-pointed tips, and oval heads of hairy, mostly grey to pink flowers.

Description

Taxonomy
Petrophile biloba was first formally described in 1830 by Robert Brown in the Supplementum to his Prodromus Florae Novae Hollandiae et Insulae Van Diemen from material collected by Charles Fraser  near the Swan River in 1827. The specific epithet (biloba) referring to the lobed leaves.

Distribution and habitat
This petrophile grows in heath over laterite from near the Canning River to near Wannamal in the Jarrah Forest and Swan Coastal Plain biogeographical regions of southwestern Western Australia.

Conservation status
Petrophile biloba is classified as "not threatened" by the Western Australian Government Department of Parks and Wildlife.

References

biloba
Eudicots of Western Australia
Proteales of Australia
Plants described in 1830
Taxa named by Robert Brown (botanist, born 1773)